The 2022 Spa-Francorchamps FIA Formula 2 round was a motor racing event held between 26 and 28 August 2022 at the Circuit de Spa-Francorchamps, Stavelot, Belgium. It was the eleventh round of the 2022 FIA Formula 2 Championship and was held in support of the 2022 Belgian Grand Prix.

Driver changes 
After competing in the previous two rounds, David Beckmann was announced to replace Jake Hughes at Van Amersfoort Racing for the remainder of the season. Beckmann was partnered by Amaury Cordeel, who returned to the series after serving his ban during the Hungary round.

Campos Racing driver Olli Caldwell was suspended from the eleventh round at Spa-Francorchamps after incurring twelve penalty points across the first ten rounds. This was second time a driver received a race ban in 2022, following Cordeel's in the previous round. Caldwell was replaced by Lirim Zendeli, who last raced in 2021 for MP Motorsport. Zendeli partnered Ralph Boschung, who returned from an extended period of injury. 

Cem Bölükbaşı terminated his contract with Charouz Racing System by mutual consent prior to the Spa-Francorchamps round. His seat was taken by IndyCar Series racer Tatiana Calderón, who returned to Formula 2 after competing for BWT Arden in 2019.

Classification

Qualifying
Felipe Drugovich took his third pole position of this season by nearly four tenths of a second, ahead of fellow Brazilian driver Enzo Fittipaldi and Logan Sargeant.

Sprint race 

Notes
 – Jehan Daruvala was supposed to start from second place, but failed to start the Sprint Race due to stalling during the reconnaissance lap. Thus, his grid slot has been left vacant.

Feature race 

Notes:
 – Enzo Fittipaldi originally finished fifth, but was later given a five-second time-penalty for leaving the track and gaining an advantage.
 – Dennis Hauger originally finished eleventh, but received a total penalty of ten seconds due to both forcing another driver off the track and exceeding track limits.
 – Marcus Armstrong received a five-second time-penalty for forcing another driver off the track.

Standings after the event 

Drivers' Championship standings

Teams' Championship standings

 Note: Only the top five positions are included for both sets of standings.

See also 
 2022 Belgian Grand Prix
 2022 Spa-Francorchamps Formula 3 round

References

External links 
 Official website

Spa
Auto races in Belgium
Spa-Francorchamps Formula 2 round
2022 in Belgian motorsport